The Virginia Smart Road, also known as simply the Smart Road or Smart Highway, is a short, limited access road in Montgomery County, Virginia, used for the testing of pavement technologies and as a proving ground for new transportation technologies. The Smart Road is currently a  stretch of road with turn-around loops at either end. The road and bridge are operated and maintained by the Virginia Department of Transportation. It is also part of the Proposed Interstate 73 Corridor.

Features
Smart Road features and operations include, but are not limited to:

 A 2.2-mile, controlled-access test track built to interstate standards
 Two paved lanes
 Three bridges, including the Smart Road Bridge (the second tallest state-maintained bridge in Virginia)
 Full-time staff that coordinate all road activities
 24/7 access control and oversight
 Centralized communications
 Lighting and weather system controls
 Safety assurance and surveillance
 Fourteen pavement sections, including an open-grade friction course
 In-pavement sensors (e.g., moisture, temperature, strain, vibration, weigh-in-motion)
 Zero-crown pavement section designed for flooded pavement testing
 An American Association of State Highway and Transportation Officials (AASHTO)-designated surface friction testing facility
 Seventy-five weather-making towers accessible on crowned and zero-crown pavement sections
 Artificial snow production of up to four inches per hour (based on suitable weather conditions)
 Production of differing intensities of rain with varying droplet sizes
 Fog production
 Two weather stations with official National Oceanic and Atmospheric Administration (NOAA) weather available within one mile
 Variable pole spacing designed to replicate 95 percent of national highway systems
 Multiple luminaire heads, including light-emitting diode (LED) modules
 A wireless mesh network variable control (i.e., luminaire dimming)
 A high-bandwidth fiber network
 A differential GPS base station
 Complete signal phase and timing (SPaT) using remote controls
 Wide shoulders for safe maneuvering during experimental testing

Segments 

In 1994, VDOT unveiled two alternate routes for the Smart Road partially to avoid smooth purple coneflower populations in Ellett Valley.

References

External links 
Virginia Smart Road
Virginia Tech Transportation Institute
Virginia Department of Transportation

Transportation in Montgomery County, Virginia
Virginia Tech
Roads in Virginia
Transportation engineering
Intelligent transportation systems